Yingshouyingzi Mining District is a district of Chengde, Hebei, China.

Administrative divisions

Towns:
Wangjiazhuang, Yingshouyingzi, Shouwangfen, Beimaquanzi

References

External links

County-level divisions of Hebei
Chengde